The Maltese National Hockey League (Lig Nazzjonali tal-Ħoki) is the official field hockey league in Malta.

Four teams currently participate in the National League, with all matches being played at the Kordin National Hockey Centre in Paola.

Clubs
 Sliema Hotsticks Hockey Club
 Young Stars Hockey Club
 Qormi Hockey Club
 White Hart Hockey Club

Former Clubs
 Rabat DePiro Hockey Club

History
Hockey was introduced in Malta by the British Services in the late nineteenth century. The home of hockey was established at Kordin Complex, which originally consisted of two pitches as well as a cricket pitch and a pavilion. The complex was inaugurated on 17th October 1888 by the then Duke of Edinburgh.

As far back as 2nd January 1906 an advertisement appeared in the ‘Daily Malta Chronicle’ which read “Hockey Sticks to suit all buyers by 30 different makers. From 35 upwards. Apply at Muscat Athletic Outfitter, 270 Strada Reale, Valletta."

Hockey competitions were held regularly in the 1930s and the game fell under the auspices of the Malta Sports’ Association, which organized league and knock-out tournaments, annually up to 1968.

During the fifties, a cavalier side used to play against foreign opposition or against pick British Services teams who happened to be stationed on the Island at the time. The team used unusual playing gear. They sported white shirts beneath waistcoats of various bright colours. The team called itself Zdieri (Maltese for waistcoats). They were the fore-runners of the Maltese National Side.

The Hockey Association Malta, as we know it today, was formed in 1968. Teams represented a cross section of the Maltese society at the time. These were members of the Civil Service, Banks, University students, the teaching profession besides other social clubs pertaining to major establishments. Over the years the league has transformed itself into teams hailing from specific towns and/or schools, and the Association has recently embarked on a campaign to promote girls’ hockey.

In April 2022 the head coach of the Malta National Team, Andre Ghio, was unceremoniously stripped of his role after a verbal altercation with a rival fan during an under 16 league match in the junior league.

Current Development
Currently there are five competitive teams in the Malta National League as well as four teams in the reserves League. The association is looking into building stronger youth systems and improving the game here in Malta through the implementation of the new Hockey 5s rules.

Challenge Cup
The Challenge Cup takes place every year, typically from October until December, with all 5 team in the National League participating. The 5 teams are placed into 2 groups (consisting of 3 and 2 teams respectively) with teams in each group playing matches against each other to determine who will proceed to the knockout rounds (the group consisting of 2 teams play each other twice). Teams then progress through the knockout until a winner is crowned in the final.

The current Challenge Cup champions are Sliema Hotsticks, beating Qormi in the final of the 2020/21 season.

League
The league commences immediately following the conclusion of the Challenge Cup. Each of the 5 participating teams play against each other in 3 game rounds.

The 2021–22 National League was the 53rd season of the National League, the top Maltese league for field hockey clubs since its establishment in 1968. The season was initially scheduled to start on 20th December 2021 but this was delayed until 30 January 2022 as a consequence of the postponement of the previous season's conclusion due to the COVID-19 pandemic.

Sliema Hotsticks are the current champions of the National League.

9-a-side League
The 9-a-side hockey league takes place annually during the first half of the hockey season. Primarily intended for reserve players, the rules of a match are unchanged from a typical 11-a-side games (except each team fields 9 players).

The champions of the 2020/21 season were Sliema Hotsticks.

References

External links
 Hockey Association Malta
 GREE Sliema Hotsticks

Field hockey in Malta
Sport in Malta